The Prunelli is a small coastal river in the department of Corse-du-Sud, Corsica, France.
It flows into the Golfe d'Ajaccio on the Mediterranean Sea.

Course

It crosses the communes of Ajaccio, Bastelica, Bastelicaccia, Cauro, Eccica-Suarella, Grosseto-Prugna, Ocana and Tolla.
The Prunelli originates in Lac de Bracca to the northeast of the  Punta Capanella and southeast of the  Punta alla Vetta.
It flows east, then turns to a southwest direction, flows through Lac de Vitalaca and continues past Bastelica.

The Prunelli is joined by the Ese river to the east of Tolla.
The Ese is crossed by the magnificent Zipitoli Genoese bridge near its confluence with the Prunelli.
To the south of Tolla the river is dammed to form the Lac de Tolla.
It continues in a southwest direction to enter the sea to the southwest of Bastelicaccia.
The lower valley is wide and full of orchards and fields.

Lakes

The lake is surrounded by pozzines, or peat lawns crossed by streams.
It is encircled by high mountains and has a dramatic panorama towards the south.

There is a belvedere on the heights above the lake from which the dam can be seen. 
The Barrage de Tolla was built between 1958 and 1960, and was commissioned in 1965.
It is owned and operated by Électricité de France (EDF).
It impounds  of water.

Tributaries

Tributary rivers are the  Gravona and the  Ese.
The following streams (ruisseaux) are tributaries of the Prunelli (ordered by length) and sub-tributaries:

 Torrent de Montichi: 
 Barbeccia: 
 Salice: 
 Carnevale: 
 Vaparale: 
 Bestiolo: 
 Acqua di Giovani: 
 Vignola: 
 Ruisseau Ajara: 
 Brotolato: 
 Molinello: 
 Agione: 
 Petra Tribiatoja: 
 Tassiccia: 
 Volta: 
 Morgone: 
 Orgiale: 
 Ritonda: 
 Frati: 
 Zizoli: 
 Villanacciu: 
 Mutuleju: 
 Funtana Griscia: 
 Cipetu: 
 Labbiolo: 
 Scileccia: 
 Castellucio: 
 Carpinella: 
 Chersichni: 
 Traggiettu: 
 Agnone: 
 Canale: 
 Rughia: 
 Arboreta: 
 San Martino: 
 Mezzaniva: 
 Gemma: 
 Acqua Grossa: 
 Latina: 
 Arinella:

Notes

Citations

Sources

 

Rivers of Corse-du-Sud
Rivers of France
Drainage basins of the Mediterranean Sea